Seawards the Great Ships is a 1961 British short documentary film directed by Hilary Harris. It won an Oscar in 1962 for Best Short Live Action Subject, the first Scottish film to win an Academy Award. The film chronicles the Shipbuilding industry of the River Clyde during the early 1960s, featuring footage from the Fairfield Shipbuilding and Engineering Company, John Brown & Company and Scotts Shipbuilding and Engineering Company. It was produced by Glasgow-based Templar Films for the Clyde Shipbuilders' Association and the Central Office of Information (COI). It was released onto Blu-ray by Panamint in 2010 as part of their 'Faces of Scotland' compilation.

It includes dialogue between shipyard workers, but this is all scripted. They had hoped to use genuine dialogue between shipyard workers, but this included too many swearwords to be usable.

Cast
 Kenneth Kendall as Narrator (Worldwide version)
 Bryden Murdoch as Narrator (Original Scottish version)

References

External links

National Library of Scotland: Scottish Screen Archive (Film details and clips from Seawards the Great Ships)

1961 films
1961 documentary films
1960s short documentary films
British short documentary films
Live Action Short Film Academy Award winners
Scottish films
Documentary films about water transport
Films set in Glasgow
1960s English-language films
1960s British films